This is a list of Royal Australian Navy (RAN) vessels which were damaged or sunk causing loss of life, in warlike and non-warlike circumstances.  The list includes incidents involving equipment (helicopters, whaleboats) attached to ships and naval establishments.  The list excludes losses on non-RAN vessels (including attacks on merchant shipping), merchant seaman deaths, and other losses (including prisoner of war deaths).  Fatalities include all lives lost on the named vessel at each incident.

By far the bloodiest conflict for the RAN was the Second World War, when 2,170 serving RAN personnel and 845 Australian merchant seaman died from all causes.

References

Losses
Navy losses
Lists of World War II ships